Bewdley Town Football Club is a football club based in Bewdley, Worcestershire, England.

History
The club was established in 1978 by a merger of Bewdley Old Boys and Woodcolliers. They joined the Kidderminster & District League, where they played until joining Division One South of the West Midlands (Regional) League in 1999. The club were Division One South runners-up in 2001–02 and champions the following season, but were not able to take promotion.

League reorganisation saw Bewdley played in Division One for the 2004–05 season and they went on to win the division, taking promotion to the Premier Division after agreeing a groundshare with Stourport Swifts. In 2010–11 the club won the Worcestershire Senior Urn, beating Studley 2–1 in the final. They retained the Urn the following season, beating Alvechurch 3–2 in the final. In 2021 the club were promoted to the Premier Division of the Midland League based on their results in the abandoned 2019–20 and 2020–21 seasons.

Ground
The club initially played at Gardeners Meadow, which had been the home ground of both Bewdley Old Boys and Woodcolliers. However, after it was sold for housing, the club temporarily moved to Kidderminster before purchasing land to build the Ribbesford Meadow Ground. They were forced to groundshare with Stourport Swifts for the 2005–06 season in order to take promotion to the Premier Division, but returned to Ribbesford Meadow the following season after building a 140-seat stand and erecting floodlights.

Honours
West Midlands (Regional) League
Division One South champions 2002–03
Worcestershire Senior Urn
Winners 2010–11, 2011–12
Worcestershire Junior Cup
Winners 2003–04, 2004–05

Records
Best FA Cup performance: First qualifying round, 2011–12, 2012–13
Best FA Vase performance: Second round, 2007–08, 2009–10, 2020–21

References

External links
Official website

Football clubs in England
Football clubs in Worcestershire
Association football clubs established in 1978
1978 establishments in England
Bewdley
Kidderminster & District Football League
West Midlands (Regional) League
Midland Football League